William Moultrie (November 23, 1730 – September 27, 1805) was an American planter and politician who became a general in the American Revolutionary War. As colonel leading a state militia, in 1776 he prevented the British from taking Charleston, and Fort Moultrie was named in his honor.

After independence, Moultrie advanced as a politician; he was elected by the legislature twice within a decade as Governor of South Carolina (1785–1787, 1792–1794), serving two terms. (The state constitution kept power in the hands of the legislature and prohibited governors from serving two terms in succession.)

Life

William Moultrie was born in Charles Town in the Province of South Carolina. His parents were the Scottish physician Dr. John Moultrie and Lucretia Cooper, and he acquired a slave plantation, enslaving over 200 African Americans.

Moultrie fought in the Anglo-Cherokee War (1761). Before the advent of the American Revolution, he was elected to the colonial assembly representing St. Helena Parish.

In 1775, Moultrie was commissioned as colonel of the 2nd South Carolina Regiment of provincial troops. In 1776, Moultrie's defense of a small fort on Sullivan's Island (later named Fort Moultrie in his honor) prevented Sir Henry Clinton and Sir Peter Parker from taking Charleston. The Continental Congress passed a resolution thanking Moultrie. He was promoted to brigadier general and his regiment was taken into the Continental Army.

Moultrie successfully led a repulse of the British at Port Royal in February 1779. That spring when Maj. Gen. Benjamin Lincoln took the bulk of the American force towards Augusta, Georgia, Moultrie was stationed at Black Swamp with a small contingent to watch the British on the other side of the Savannah River. When the British suddenly crossed the Savannah en masse and tried to move on Charleston, Moultrie managed a skillful tactical retreat across the Coosawhatchie and the Tullifiny Rivers and all the way back to Charleston where he held off a short siege. He refused to surrender at a time when the civilian authorities in Charleston felt somewhat abandoned by the Continental Congress and were almost ready to give up.

Moultrie was captured when Charleston surrendered to the British in 1780. He was left in command of the American POWs which required all of the patience and skill of a diplomat when advocating for his men against the harsh British commandant, Lt. Col. Nisbet Balfour. The British also attempted to lure him to their side, and he was absolutely indignant when he was approached by Charles Greville Montague. Moultrie was eventually exchanged for British prisoners and in the last year of the war, he was promoted to major general in 1782, the last man appointed by Congress to that rank.

After the war he was elected by the new state legislature as 35th Governor of South Carolina (1785–1787).  The state constitution prohibited men from serving two successive terms as governor, an effort to keep power in the hands of the legislature. Moultrie was re-elected by the legislature in 1792, serving into 1794.
 
William Moultrie was the first president of the Society of the Cincinnati of the State of South Carolina and served in that capacity until his death.

In 1802 he published his Memoirs of the Revolution as far as it Related to the States of North and South Carolina.

Legacy
After the war, the fort he had defended was renamed Fort Moultrie in his honor. It operated as a pivotal defense point until supplanted by Fort Sumter. Fort Moultrie was used as an active post of the United States Army from 1798 until the end of World War Two.

Moultrie County, Illinois is also named in his honor. Ochlockoney, Georgia was renamed in 1859 as Moultrie when it was incorporated by the Georgia General Assembly.

In 2018, notable South Carolinian and future Secretary of State Walter S. Moore named his pitbull after Moultrie.

Moultrie Flag
During his notable defense of the fort in 1776, a flag of Moultrie's own design was flown: a field of blue bearing a white crescent with the word LIBERTY on it. The flag was shot down during the fight. Sergeant William Jasper held it up to rally the troops, and the story became widely known. The flag became an icon of the Revolution in the South. It was called the Moultrie, or the Liberty Flag. The new state of South Carolina incorporated its design into its state flag.

References

Further reading
 Bragg, C.L. Crescent Moon Over Carolina: William Moultrie and American Liberty. Columbia: University of South Carolina Press, 2013 (336 pages).

External links
SCIway Biography of William Moultrie
http://www.nga.org/cms/home/governors/past-governors-bios/page_south_carolina/col2-content/main-content-list/title_moultrie_william.html
 
 The Society of the Cincinnati
The American Revolution Institute

1730 births
1805 deaths
American people of Scottish descent
American slave owners
American Revolutionary War prisoners of war held by Great Britain
Continental Army generals
Continental Army officers from South Carolina
Members of the South Carolina House of Representatives
Lieutenant Governors of South Carolina
People of South Carolina in the French and Indian War
Politicians from Charleston, South Carolina
Governors of South Carolina
South Carolina state senators
South Carolina Federalists
Federalist Party state governors of the United States
Flag designers
South Carolina militiamen in the American Revolution